Nokdong station is a railway station on Gwangju Metro Line 1 in Nokdong, South Korea. The station is located near at the depot.

Station layout

Gallery

External links

Gwangju Metro stations
Railway stations opened in 2004
Dong District, Gwangju